The Sound of Feeling (full title Leonard Feather Presents The Sound of Feeling and The Sound of Oliver Nelson) is a jazz album featuring two separate groups featuring Oliver Nelson recorded in late 1966 and released on the Verve label. The split album begins with five tracks by the Los Angeles based group The Sound of Feeling, featuring identical twin vocalists Alyce and Rhae Andrece and pianist Gary David with the addition of soloist Nelson. Four tracks are by the Encyclopedia of Jazz All Stars, a big band drawn from the ranks of top New York studio musicians, arranged and conducted by Nelson which were recorded to accompany Leonard Feather's Encyclopedia of Jazz in the Sixties.

Reception

In the November 28, 1968 issue, the long-lived and much respected jazz publication Down Beat magazine awarded the album four and a half stars.

The Allmusic site awarded the album 2 stars.

Track listing
 "My Favorite Things" (Richard Rodgers, Oscar Hammerstein II) - 3:24
 "Waltz Without Words" (Gary David) - 4:09
 "Who Knows What Love Is?" (David) - 4:25
 "Phrases" (Alyce Andrece, Rhae Andrece) - 3:40
 "Circe Revisited" (David, Bob Fylling) - 5:56
 "Ricardo's Dilemma" (Roy Ayers) - 2:33
 "Twelve Tone Blues" (mistitled as "Patterns for Orchestra") (Oliver Nelson) - 3:07
 "The Sidewalks of New York" (Charles B. Lawlor, James W. Blake) - 6:27
 "Greensleeves" (Traditional) - 2:26
Recorded at Van Gelder Studio in Englewood Cliffs, NJ on November 3, 1966 (track 6) and November 4 (tracks 7-9), 1966 and in Los Angeles, CA on December 11, 1967 (tracks 1-5).

Personnel

The Sound of Feeling (tracks 1-5)
Oliver Nelson - soprano saxophone
Alyce Andrece, Rhae Andrece - vocals
Gary David - composer, arranger, vocals, piano (1-5), marxophone (5)
Chuck Domanico, Ray Neapolitan  - bass
Dick Wilson - drums

The Oliver Nelson Orchestra (tracks 6-9)
Oliver Nelson - arranger, conductor
Burt Collins (6), Joe Newman, Ernie Royal, Clark Terry, Joe Wilder, Snooky Young (6-9), Nat Adderley (7-9) - trumpet, flugelhorn
Nat Adderley - cornet (7-9)
Jimmy Cleveland, J. J. Johnson - additional trombones
Bob Brookmeyer - valve trombone
Tony Studd - bass trombone
Jerry Dodgion, Jerome Richardson - flutes
Jerome Richardson - soprano saxophone
Jerry Dodgion, Phil Woods - clarinets, alto saxophones
Jerome Richardson, Zoot Sims - tenor saxophones
Danny Bank - baritone saxophone
Al Dailey (6), Hank Jones (7-9) - piano
Eric Gale - guitar
Ron Carter - bass
Grady Tate  - drums
Phil Kraus (6), Bobby Rosengarden (7-9) - mallets, additional percussion

References

1968 albums
Verve Records albums
Oliver Nelson albums
Albums recorded at Van Gelder Studio
Albums produced by Creed Taylor